Amber Skies is the debut album from the Wexford based Irish all-female rock band The Jades. It was released at a show in Crawdaddy on 14 August 2009.

Production
For the past year, The Jades have been in the studio working on their debut album with David Odlum. The first fruit of their combined efforts titled ‘Sooner or Later’,  was released on 16 May 2009 on their own Rag Doll label. The single has already been described by one music industry insider as “a pounding slice of melodic pop/rock with harmonies to die for”.

All of the tracks on their forthcoming album are originals by The Jades, who pride themselves on being one of the few all-female bands in Ireland (or the world for that matter) writing their own songs and playing their own instruments.

According to guitarist and backing vocalist Elaine, “we’ve recorded the album, including the single, mostly in Wexford and in Sun Studios in Temple Bar and then we spent ten days in France to add the finishing touches. We’re really excited about getting the album done and getting the single out. We’re also looking forward to doing some live gigs after having been in the studio for so much of last year”.

Track listing 
"Bermuda Song"
"Last Laugh"
"Sooner or Later"
"Beautiful Thing"
"Loser"
"The Way"
"Look At Me Now"
"Over And Over"
"You And Me"
"You In The Corner"

2009 debut albums